The 1882 international cricket season was from April 1882 to September 1882. The season consisted of a single international tour, visiting with Australia  England for one-off series which was won by Australia. The match is not considered to be part of The Ashes since it preceded the introduction of the trophy.

Season overview

July

Australia in England

References

International cricket competitions by season
1882 in cricket